Luciano Wilk (born 24 July 1951) is an Argentine rower. He competed in the men's coxless four event at the 1972 Summer Olympics.

References

1951 births
Living people
Argentine male rowers
Olympic rowers of Argentina
Rowers at the 1972 Summer Olympics
Place of birth missing (living people)
Pan American Games medalists in rowing
Pan American Games bronze medalists for Argentina
Rowers at the 1971 Pan American Games